Forests Act may refer to:

Forests Act 1949 in New Zealand
Indian Forest Act, 1927

See also
National Forest Act (disambiguation)